Maree Tomkinson (born 15 October 1968) is an Australian dressage rider. She represented Australia at the 2014 World Equestrian Games in Normandy where she finished 10th in the team competition and 43rd in the individual dressage competition.

References

Living people
1968 births
Australian female equestrians
Australian dressage riders